AAU UnC Concórdia  is a women's handball club from Concórdia, Brazil. Currently, they compete in the Brazilian National League.

Accomplishments
Brazilian National League:
2013,2017, 2018
South and Central American Women's Club Handball Championship:
2019
Super Globe:
2019:

Team

Current squad
Squad for the 2019 IHF Super Globe.

Goalkeepers
 1  Luciane Verona
 20  Maite Lima Dias
Wings
RW
 7  Aline Bieger
 14  Agda Pereira
 15  Ana Luiza Aguiar
LW
 10  Barbarah Monteiro
 88  Jamily Felix
Line players
 2  Nadyne Morcineck
 6  Sabrina Fiore

Back players
LB
 3  Eduarda Engel
 13  Talita Alves Carneiro
 19  Amanda Caetano
 22  Francieli Sothe
CB
 99  Tauani Schneider
RB
 4  Daise Oliveira
 73  Juliane Pereira

References

Brazilian handball clubs
Handball in Brazil
Sport in Santa Catarina (state)